The Second cabinet of Nicolas Jean-de-Dieu Soult was announced on 12 May 1839 by King Louis Philippe I.
It replaced the Transitional French cabinet of 1839.

After a defeat in the Chamber of Deputies on 20 February 1840, the ministers gave their resignations to the king.
The ministry was replaced on 1 March 1840 by the Second cabinet of Adolphe Thiers.

Ministers

The cabinet was created by ordinance of 12 May 1839. The ministers were:

 President of the Council of Ministers: Nicolas Soult
 Foreign Affairs: Nicolas Soult
 Interior: Tanneguy Duchâtel
 Justice and Religious Affairs: Jean-Baptiste Teste
 War: Antoine Virgile Schneider
 Finance: Hippolyte Passy
 Navy and Colonies: Guy-Victor Duperré
 Public Education: Abel-François Villemain
 Public Works: Jules Armand Dufaure
 Agriculture and Commerce: Laurent Cunin-Gridaine

References

Sources

French governments
1839 establishments in France
1840 disestablishments in France
Cabinets established in 1839
Cabinets disestablished in 1840